Lasse Johansson may refer to:

 Lucidor (1638–1674), Swedish baroque poet
 Lasse Johansson (footballer) (born 1975), Swedish footballer
 Lars-Olof Johansson (born 1973), guitarist with The Cardigans